Marvin Darnell Harrison Sr. (born August 25, 1972) is an American former professional football player who was a wide receiver for 13 seasons with the Indianapolis Colts of the National Football League (NFL), much of it with quarterback Peyton Manning. He played college football for the Syracuse Orange and was drafted by Colts in the first round of the 1996 NFL Draft. 

Harrison earned a Super Bowl ring with the team in Super Bowl XLI where they beat the Chicago Bears. An eight-time Pro Bowler and All-Pro member, he held the record for most receptions in a single season (143) until it was broken by Michael Thomas (149) in 2019. Harrison was inducted into the Pro Football Hall of Fame in 2016 and is widely considered one of the greatest wide receivers in NFL history.

College career
Harrison attended Syracuse University, where he was a three-year starter for the Syracuse Orange football team, playing with quarterback Donovan McNabb in his final year. Harrison set a school record with 2,718 career receiving yards, which stood until 2017, when it was broken by Steve Ishmael in the final game of his career. Harrison also returned 42 punts for 542 yards and two touchdowns and ranked second to Rob Moore in school history with 20 receiving touchdowns. Harrison graduated with a degree in retail management.

Professional career

Harrison was selected by the Indianapolis Colts as the 19th selection in the 1996 NFL Draft, a selection which was obtained in a trade that sent Jeff George to the Atlanta Falcons. Harrison went on to become one of the most productive receivers from that draft class, which included Keyshawn Johnson, Eric Moulds, Bobby Engram, Muhsin Muhammad, Eddie Kennison, Terry Glenn, Amani Toomer, Joe Horn, and Terrell Owens among others.

In 2002, Harrison broke Herman Moore's single-season receptions record by 20 receptions. He finished with 143 catches, and he also had 1,722 yards receiving. That record stood until December 22, 2019 when Michael Thomas of the New Orleans Saints broke that record with 149. In December 2006, Harrison became just the fourth player in NFL history to record 1000 receptions, joining Jerry Rice (1549), Cris Carter (1101), and Tim Brown (1094). He is also one of only seven wide receivers in NFL history to reach 100 touchdowns.

In 2005, Harrison had five 100+ yard receiving games in a seven-game stretch late in the season. During Week 15, he passed Isaac Bruce to become 10th in all-time career receiving yards, and also the leader among active players. He maintained this title for exactly two seasons, until Bruce retook the lead in Week 15 of 2007. Harrison had injured his knee against the Denver Broncos while attempting a block and was lost for the season, making only a small appearance in their lone playoff game that season. It marked only the second time Harrison had missed regular-season action due to injuries and the first since 1998.

On December 14, 2008, in a game against the Detroit Lions, Harrison caught his 1,095th career reception, passing Tim Brown for third all time. He passed Cris Carter to become second on the all-time NFL reception record list with 1,102 receptions during a 23–0 Colts victory over the Tennessee Titans on December 28, 2008.

Following the 2008 NFL season, Harrison asked for and was granted his release by the Colts. After sitting out the entire 2009 season, Harrison quietly retired from the NFL.

Harrison was inducted into the Indianapolis Colts Ring of Honor during the week 12 game against the Carolina Panthers on November 27, 2011. He is widely considered one of the greatest wide receivers in NFL history and was inducted into the Pro Football Hall of Fame in 2016.

NFL career statistics

Regular season

Postseason

NFL records
 Most receptions in an 8 season period (826), 1999–2006; 9 season period (885), 1998–2006; 10 season period (958), 1997–2006; 11 season period (1,022), 1996–2006
 Most games in a career with at least 8 receptions (51), 9 receptions (32), 11 receptions (12), 12 receptions (8)
 Most consecutive games with at least 6 receptions (16) and 9 receptions (6)
 Most consecutive seasons with at least 5 touchdowns (11) – shared with Jerry Rice, Don Hutson, Cris Carter, Tim Brown, Terrell Owens, Frank Gore
 Most consecutive seasons with at least 6 touchdowns (11) – shared with Terrell Owens, Jerry Rice, Don Hutson
 Most consecutive seasons with at least 5 touchdown receptions (11) – shared with Jerry Rice, Don Hutson, Cris Carter, Tim Brown, Terrell Owens
 Most consecutive seasons with at least 6 touchdown receptions (11) – shared with Jerry Rice, Don Hutson
 Most consecutive seasons with at least 10 touchdown receptions (8)
 Most consecutive seasons with at least 11 touchdown receptions (4)-tied with Lance Alworth, Art Powell
 Most consecutive seasons with at least 14 touchdown receptions (2)-tied with Jerry Rice
 Consecutive seasons with 1,400+ receiving yards (4); 1999–2002 (broken by Julio Jones (5); 2014-2018)
 Consecutive seasons with 82+ receptions (8); 1999–2006
 Most games in a single season (2002) with at least 6 receptions (15), 7 receptions (12)-broken by Antonio Brown, 8 receptions (12), 9 receptions (10)-tied by Julio Jones, 11 receptions (5)
 Marvin Harrison and Peyton Manning currently hold the NFL record for most completions between a wide receiver and quarterback with 953.
 Marvin Harrison and Peyton Manning currently hold the NFL record for passing touchdowns between a WR and QB with 114.
 Marvin Harrison and Peyton Manning currently hold the NFL record for passing yards between a WR and QB with 12,766.
 Marvin Harrison and Peyton Manning currently hold the NFL record for completions in a season between a WR and QB with 143 in 2002.
 First player to record 2 seasons of 1,600 yards receiving in NFL history, (1999 & 2002). (Torry Holt became the 2nd, (2000 & 2003), Calvin Johnson became the 3rd (2011 & 2012)) Antonio Brown became the 4th (2014 & 2015) Julio Jones became the 5th (2015 & 2018)).
 First player to have 50+ receptions in his first 11 seasons in NFL history. (Torry Holt became the 2nd on December 27, 2009)
 Most consecutive seasons of 1,000+ all-purpose yards and 10+ touchdown receptions (8), 1999–2006
 On December 18, 2006, Marvin Harrison and Indianapolis Colt teammate Reggie Wayne became the only NFL wide receiver tandem to catch 75 receptions and 1,000 yards in 3 straight seasons. The game was on Monday Night and was played against the Cincinnati Bengals.
 On December 10, 2006, made his 1000th reception against the Jacksonville Jaguars. And is the fastest player to do so reaching the mark in 167 career games
 On December 28, 2008, made his 1,100th career reception against the Tennessee Titans in his last regular season game and his last game in Indianapolis. He is the fastest player to do so reaching the mark in 190 career games.
 Most receptions over first 7 seasons (665), 8 seasons (759), 9 seasons (845), 10 seasons (927), 11 seasons (1,022) and 13 seasons (1,102) of career of any NFL receiver
 Most consecutive games with a reception to start a career (190)
 Most average receptions per game in a career (5.8) – 1996–2008
 Most consecutive games with 8+ receiving yards (190), (206 if counting playoffs) – every game
 Most consecutive games with a 6+ yard reception (190), (206 if counting playoffs) – every game
 Most consecutive games with an 8+ yard reception (177), (192 if counting playoffs)

Personal life
Harrison was sued in a civil lawsuit by Dwight Dixon, a convicted drug dealer, after Dixon was shot outside Chuckie's Garage, a North Philadelphia business owned by Harrison, on April 29, 2008. The two men had been in a fight minutes prior to the shooting over an issue that happened a few weeks earlier, when Dixon and Harrison got into a verbal argument when Harrison denied Dixon entry into Playmakers, a sports bar owned and operated by Harrison. Dixon alleged that Harrison was the gunman who shot at him. On January 6, 2009, Philadelphia District Attorney Lynne Abraham confirmed that the gun that fired shots at Dixon was the same model as Harrison's gun, but they had been unable to determine who pulled the trigger.

Abraham also stated that she was not going to pursue charges in this case due to conflicting witness statements. In fact, within a week of the first shooting, Marvin Harrison was not considered a suspect. Dixon, who had initially given the police a false name and claimed he was robbed by two men when interviewed at the hospital, was subsequently convicted of filing a false report for this incident on January 28, 2009. Dixon was sentenced to 6 months probation. Dixon's attorney reportedly sought a new trial as the conviction violated Dixon's parole in an unrelated case. Harrison was also sued by Robert Nixon, a victim caught in the crossfire of the shooting who identified Harrison as the shooter in a statement to the police.

Dixon died on July 21, 2009, after he was shot several times while in his car outside a building two blocks away from Harrison's sports bar. At the hospital after the shooting, detectives questioned Dixon before surgery and he stated that it stemmed from the Harrison incident a year prior and that Harrison had hired a gunman to shoot him. An informant also made a statement asserting the gunman that killed Dixon was Lonnie Harrison, Marvin Harrison's cousin. On June 16, 2010, Shaun Assael of ESPN The Magazine reported that the police confiscated a 9mm handgun from Harrison during a routine traffic stop on Wednesday in Philadelphia. They tested the gun to see if it matched three spent 9mm shell casings that ended up inside the truck driven by Dwight Dixon at the scene of an April 2008 shooting. Dixon, who eventually was shot and killed after filing a civil lawsuit, claimed that the casings came from a second gun that Harrison fired. Authorities already have matched other bullets to a separate gun that Harrison owns—and that he stated was in his home on the day the shooting occurred. They found the gun during a search of Harrison's Escalade. The stop occurred as Harrison drove the vehicle the wrong way on a one-way street. Harrison claimed he did not have a gun. But the police believed they saw Harrison put what appeared to be a weapon in the console between the two front seats. They concluded that they had probable cause to search the vehicle and they found the gun, but Harrison was not charged. Another incident occurred in 2014 when Harrison narrowly escaped a Philadelphia shooting.

Harrison's son, Marvin Harrison Jr., plays college football for the Ohio State Buckeyes.

References

External links
Indianapolis Colts bio

1972 births
Living people
10,000 receiving yards club
African-American players of American football
American Conference Pro Bowl players
American football wide receivers
Indianapolis Colts players
People from Cheltenham, Pennsylvania
Players of American football from Indianapolis
Players of American football from Philadelphia
Pro Football Hall of Fame inductees
Syracuse Orange football players